Andrej Vasiljević (born September 23, 1993) is a Croatian ice hockey goaltender. He is currently playing with KHL Medveščak Zagreb of the Kontinental Hockey League (KHL).

Vasiljević made his debut with KHL Medveščak Zagreb during the 2010–11 season.

References

External links

1993 births
Croatian ice hockey goaltenders
KHL Medveščak Zagreb players
Living people
Sportspeople from Zagreb